Ralph Eure, 3rd Baron Eure (24 September 1558 – 1 April 1617), of Ingleby and Malton, Yorkshire, was an English nobleman and politician. The surname, also given as Evers, was at that time probably pronounced "Ewry".

Life
He was the son of William Eure, 2nd Baron Eure and Margaret Dymoke, daughter of Sir Edward  Dymoke, the Hereditary King's Champion and Anne Taillboys.

Eure matriculated at St John's College, Cambridge in 1568, and was admitted at Gray's Inn in 1575. He was a Member of the Parliament of England for Yorkshire 1584. He succeeded to the title in 1594 (N.S.), and served on the Council of Wales and the Marches.

Eure served as Warden of the Middle March from 1586 to 1588 and again in 1595, a troubled position. He came into conflict with Thomas Scrope, 10th Baron Scrope of Bolton, Warden of the West March, siding with Thomas Carleton over the Kinmont Willie affair. In another quarrel, he allegedly tried to poison John Browne (MP for Morpeth), following an attack on Browne by his servants, and the loss of his position in 1598. 

In the case of Thomas Posthumous Hoby, whose house had been made the scene of rowdy and threatening behaviour by Eure's son William and others in 1600, Eure's position as Vice-president of the Council of the North came into play. Hoby sought and received some redress through the Star Chamber. This was after Eure had suggested duelling as the manly way.

In 1602 Eure led a diplomatic mission to Bremen. With Daniel Donne and Sir John Herbert he met Danish representatives there, on commercial matters concerned with the law of the sea. He took Thomas Morton with him as chaplain, in addition to Richard Crakanthorpe. The mission ended with the death of the queen in 1603.

Eure became the President of the Council of Wales and the Marches in 1607, a position based at Ludlow Castle in Shropshire. His time as President was marked by a campaign from Sir Herbert Croft to remove the council's jurisdiction over a number of English counties.  He died on 1 April 1617 aged 58, and was buried at Ludlow's St Laurence's Church, where his first wife was already buried.

Family
Eure married first, by 1578, Mary, daughter of Sir John Dawnay (of Sessay, Yorkshire), who was MP for Thirsk. William Eure, 4th Baron Eure was his son by this marriage. They had at least one daughter, Barbara, who married William Ireland: their son was the Catholic martyr  William Ireland. Mary died in March 1612 and was buried at Ludlow, where a tomb effigy was erected in St Laurence's Church.

He married, secondly, Elizabeth Spencer, daughter of Sir John Spencer  and Katherine Kitson, and widow of George Carey, 2nd Baron Hunsdon. She survived him, dying early in 1618, and was buried with her first husband in Westminster Abbey.

Arms

References

1558 births
1617 deaths
Alumni of St John's College, Cambridge
Burials in Shropshire
Members of the Parliament of England for constituencies in Yorkshire
English MPs 1584–1585
High Sheriffs of Yorkshire
Lord-Lieutenants of Wales
Lord-Lieutenants of Herefordshire
Lord-Lieutenants of Shropshire
Lord-Lieutenants of Worcestershire
17th-century English diplomats
Ralph